Bizzin may refer to:

Buzzin', a 2001 album by The Vibrators
"Buzzin'" (Mann song), a 2010 song by American hip hop artist Mann
"Buzzin'" (Shwayze song), the 2008 first single by American alternative hip hop artist Shwayze
Buzzin (TV series), a 2008 show about musicians Cisco Adler and Shwayze

See also
Sebastiano Buzzin (1929–2007), Italian footballer
Buzz (disambiguation)